Ćurčić is a Serbian and Croatian surname. It may refer to:

Đorđe Ćurčić (basketball, born 2004), Serbian basketball player
Đorđe Ćurčić (basketball, born 2005), Serbian basketball player
Miroslav Ćurčić (b. 1962), Serbian former football player
Saša Ćurčić (b. 1972), Serbian former football midfielder
Radovan Ćurčić (b. 1972), Serbian football manager and former player
Radisav Ćurčić (b. 1965), Serbian-Israeli basketball player, 1999 Israeli Basketball Premier League MVP

See also
Ćurić

Serbian surnames
Slavic-language surnames
Patronymic surnames